The Pliva Waterfall is located by the town of Jajce, in central Bosnia and Herzegovina, where the river Pliva meets the river Vrbas. The waterfall is a large tufa, also known as travertine barrier, making over 22 meters cascade on the Pliva river, in a narrow karstic zone, which follows the Pliva course, retracted into a flysh and limestone contact zone. It was 30 meters high, but after an earthquake during the Bosnian war and attacks on the power plant further up the river, the area was flooded and now the waterfall is 22 meters high.
  
The old Jajce walled city core, including the waterfall, and other individual sites outside the walled city perimeter, such as the Jajce Mithraeum, is designated as The natural and architectural ensemble of Jajce and proposed for inscription into the UNESCO's World Heritage Site list. The bid for inscription is currently placed on the UNESCO Tentative list.

Scenery

References

Waterfalls of Bosnia and Herzegovina
Landforms of the Federation of Bosnia and Herzegovina
Pliva (river)
Jajce

Jajce